DXMM (810 AM) was a radio station of UM Broadcasting Network (UMBN) in the Philippines. It was established in 1963 as the third AM station of UMBN after DXMC (now DXWT) and DXUM. The station was shut down under martial law.

Currently, the callsign is assigned to an AM station in Jolo, Sulu.

References

Radio stations in Davao City
College radio stations in the Philippines
Radio stations established in 1963
Radio stations disestablished in 1972
Defunct radio stations in the Philippines